Cosmic background may refer to:

 Cosmic microwave background radiation (CMB)
 Cosmic neutrino background (CνB)
 Cosmic gravitational wave background (GWB)
 Cosmic infrared background (CIB)
 Cosmic background radiation
 Cosmic X-ray background
 Cosmic visible light background

See also
 
 
 Cosmic (disambiguation)
 Background (disambiguation)